The Nikkor 13mm 5.6 is an ultra-wide angle rectilinear lens which was manufactured by Nikon for use on Nikon 135 film format SLR cameras until 1998, at which time it was discontinued. It has been dubbed 'The Holy Grail', for its low-distortion ultra-wide capabilities.  The lens was produced by Nikon only upon receipt of an order, thus making it one of the Nikon lenses with the least number manufactured.

Introduction 

The lens was prototyped in 1973 and released on an 'order only' basis from March 1976. It was designed by Mr Ikuo Mori, First Optical Section, Optical Designing Department (now retired) and built in Japan.

Features 

 Very little distortion (less than typical 50 mm normal lenses) and lateral chromatic aberration.
 Close Range Optical Correction (CRC) system: floating lens elements are used to reduce aberrations at close focusing distances.

Construction 

 16 lens elements in 12 groups
 Extreme retrofocus optical design with backfocus of more than three times the focal length.
 Triplet/Tessar type master lens group behind the aperture.
 Wide-angle lens group in front of the aperture to reduce the image size.

Versions 

 Nikkor F 13mm 5.6 - March 1976 (non-AI).  Serial numbers began with:  175021.
 AI Nikkor 13mm 5.6 - June 1977.  Serial numbers began with:  175055.
 AIS Nikkor 13mm 5.6 - March 1982. Discontinued in 1998.  Serial numbers began with:  175901

See also 
 The Zeiss 8R Ultra Prime T2.8 is a rectilinear wide angle lens with an even slightly wider field of view, even when considering its smaller image circle.
 The Sigma 12–24mm f/4.5–5.6, introduced in 2003, a rectilinear ultra-wide zoom designed for the 35 mm format (both film and digital), providing a slightly wider field of view. The company replaced this lens in 2016 with a version offering the same focal length range but a constant maximum aperture of f/4. 
 The Sigma 8–16mm, introduced in 2010, a rectilinear ultra-wide zoom designed for DSLRs with APS-C sensors, providing essentially the same 35mm equivalent field of view as the company's 12–24mm offering on full-frame.
 The Canon EF 11–24mm, introduced in 2015, a rectilinear ultra-wide zoom designed for the company's full-frame DSLRs.
 The ultra-wide camera in the iPhone 12 and later models is based upon the Nikkor 13mm, in so far as having approximately the same angle of view and complete lack of barrel distortion.

References 

Products introduced in 1976
Nikon F-mount lenses